Paroedura stumpffi is a species of lizard in the family Gekkonidae. The species is endemic to Madagascar.

Etymology
The specific name, stumpffi, is in honor of Anton Stumpff who collected the holotype.

Geographic range
P. stumpffi is found in northern Madagascar, including associated islands Nosy Be, Nosy Komba, and Nosy Mitsio.

Habitat

Reproduction
P. stumpffi is oviparous.

References

Further reading
Böttger O (1879). "Diagnosen zweier neuer Amphibien aus Madagascar ". Berichte über die Senckenbergische naturforschende Gesellschaft in Frankfurt am Main 1878–1879: 85–86. (Phyllodactylus stumpffi, new species, p. 85). (title in German, text in Latin).
Boulenger GA (1885). Catalogue of the Lizards in the British Museum (Natural History). Second Edition. Volume I. Geckonidæ ... London: Trustees of the British Museum (Natural History). (Taylor and Francis, printers). xii + 436 pp. + Plates I–XXXII. (Phyllodactylus stumpffi, pp. 86–87).
Glaw F, Vences M (2006). A Field Guide to Amphibians and Reptiles of Madagascar, Third Edition. Cologne, Germany: Vences & Glaw Verlag. 496 pp. .

Paroedura
Reptiles of Madagascar
Reptiles described in 1879